Abercius (Avercius, Avircius, Avirkios) is a men's given name that may refer to:

 The Inscription of Abercius, a hagiography from Abercius of Hieropolis
Abercius of Hieropolis, the writer of that document and a Christian saint
Abercius of Abercius and Helena, a pair of sibling martyrs
Saint Abercius, a Christian martyr
Abercius (martyr), a Christian martyr